John II of Werdenberg (c. 1430 – 23 February 1486, Frankfurt am Main) was a German nobleman and clergyman of the house of Werdenberg. From 1469 to his death he was bishop of Augsburg.

Family
He was one of sixteen children born to John IV, Count of Werdenberg-Sargans (died 1465) and his wife Elisabeth of Württemberg (1412–1476), daughter of Eberhard III, Count of Württemberg and granddaughter of Louis IV, Holy Roman Emperor. His brothers included Hugo XI of Werdenberg (died 1508), Henry XIII of Werdenberg (died 1505) and Rudolf X of Werdenberg (died 1497). His sisters Margaret of Werdenberg (died 1496) and Anna of Werdenberg (died 1497) both became abbesses of Buchau Abbey, whilst another sister Agnes of Werdenberg married Jobst Nikolaus I, Count of Hohenzollern.

Life and work

References

Sources

Roman Catholic bishops of Augsburg
1430 births
1486 deaths